Ronald Robson (1 December 1912 – 16 May 1986) was a South African cricketer. He played in fifteen first-class matches for Eastern Province between 1933/34 and 1939/40.

See also
 List of Eastern Province representative cricketers

References

External links
 

1912 births
1986 deaths
South African cricketers
Eastern Province cricketers
People from Mossel Bay
Cricketers from the Western Cape